James Owen Sullivan (February 9, 1981 – December 28, 2009), also known by his stage name the Rev (shortened version of the Reverend Tholomew Plague), was an American musician, best known as a member of the heavy metal band Avenged Sevenfold, where he played drums, piano and provided backing and co-lead vocals. He was also the lead vocalist/pianist in the avant-garde metal band Pinkly Smooth and drummed for the ska punk band Suburban Legends from 1998 to 1999.

Career 
Sullivan was born on February 9, 1981, of Irish descent and raised Roman Catholic. He received his first pair of drumsticks at the age of five and his own drum set at the age of twelve. In high school, he started playing in bands. Before leaving to join Avenged Sevenfold as one of the band's founding members, Sullivan was the drummer for the third wave ska band Suburban Legends. At the age of 19, he recorded his first album with Avenged Sevenfold titled Sounding the Seventh Trumpet. His early influences included Frank Zappa and King Crimson. The Rev stated in an interview with Modern Drummer that he "was raised on that stuff as much as rock and metal."

Later in life, he was influenced by drummers Vinnie Paul, Mike Portnoy (who would later be his fill-in with Avenged Sevenfold), Dave Lombardo, Lars Ulrich, and Terry Bozzio, stating "It's funny [...], of all my influences, Tommy Lee is a visual influence. I never thought I'd have one of those." Sullivan had a signature ability called "the double-ride thing" or "the Double Octopus", as the Rev called it, "just for lack of a better definition." "The double-ride thing" is a technique that can be heard on tracks such as "Almost Easy", "Critical Acclaim", "Crossroads", and "Dancing Dead", in which Sullivan doubles up at a fast tempo between the double bass and ride cymbals.

The Rev was the drummer, composer, songwriter, vocalist, and pianist for the band. His vocals are featured in several Avenged Sevenfold songs, including "Strength of the World", "Afterlife", "A Little Piece of Heaven", "Almost Easy", "Scream", "Critical Acclaim", "Lost", "Brompton Cocktail", "Crossroads", "Flash of the Blade" (Iron Maiden cover), "Art of Subconscious Illusion", "Save Me", and "Fiction".
He also wrote and composed several songs for Avenged Sevenfold including "A Little Piece of Heaven", "Afterlife", "Almost Easy", "Unbound (The Wild Ride)", "Buried Alive", "Fiction", "Brompton Cocktail", "Welcome to the Family", "Save Me", among others. Avenged Sevenfold released a demo version of "Nightmare" featuring the Rev on an electronic drumset and providing some vocals.

At the second annual Revolver Golden God Awards, the Rev won the award for "Best Drummer". His family members, and Avenged Sevenfold, received the posthumous honor on his behalf.

In an Ultimate Guitar online readers' poll of the "Top Ten Greatest Drummers of All Time", the Rev appeared at No. 8, placing higher than Bill Ward of Black Sabbath and lower than Keith Moon of the Who. In 2017, he once again appeared in Ultimate Guitar's list of Top 25 Greatest Singing Drummers, at No. 5.

Pinkly Smooth
Pinkly Smooth was an American heavy metal/avant-garde metal band. The band was formed in the summer of 2001 in Huntington Beach, California, as a side project of the Rev, and originally featured Rev (under the name "Rathead") on vocals, along with fellow Avenged Sevenfold member Synyster Gates on guitar and former Ballistico band members Buck Silverspur (under the name "El Diablo") on bass, as well as Derek Eglit (under the name "Super Loop") on drums. They released only one album, Unfortunate Snort, which featured former Avenged Sevenfold bassist Justin Meacham (under his stage name "Justin Sane") as a keyboard player.

Death
On December 28, 2009, the Rev was found unresponsive in his Huntington Beach home, and was later pronounced dead upon arrival to the hospital. Police ruled out foul play and noted that his death appeared to be from natural causes. An autopsy performed on December 30, 2009, was inconclusive, but toxicology results revealed to the public in June that he died from an overdose of oxycodone (Percocet), oxymorphone (a metabolite of oxycodone), diazepam (Valium), nordiazepam (a metabolite of diazepam), and alcohol. The coroner noted an enlarged heart as a "significant condition" that may have played a role in Sullivan's death.

On January 6, 2010, a private funeral was held for Sullivan, who was then buried in The Good Shepherd Cemetery in Huntington Beach, California. Shortly after his death, Avenged Sevenfold dedicated their fifth studio album Nightmare to him, as well as several songs, including "So Far Away", which had been written by bandmate (and childhood friend) Synyster Gates, and "Fiction", which the Rev had written three days before his death. M. Shadows and Gates stated in an interview to Hard Drive Radio:

Legacy
His triple bass drum kit from the 2008 Taste of Chaos tour was donated for display at a Hard Rock Cafe in Las Vegas. It has since been taken down. Another drum kit he used is displayed in a Hard Rock Cafe in Gatlinburg, Tennessee.

Discography

with Suburban Legends
Origin Edition (1999)

with Pinkly Smooth
Unfortunate Snort (2001)

with Brian Haner
Fistfight at the Wafflehouse (2010) (posthumous; drums on "Bring My Baby Back")

with Avenged Sevenfold
Sounding the Seventh Trumpet (2001)
Waking the Fallen (2003)
City of Evil (2005)
Avenged Sevenfold (2007)
Live in the LBC & Diamonds in the Rough (2008) 
Nightmare (2010) (posthumous; some vocals, lyrics, and composing featured; vocals and drums on demo tracks; co-lead vocals on "Fiction")

References

External links

1981 births
2009 deaths
American heavy metal drummers
American heavy metal keyboardists
American male musical theatre actors
American rock pianists
American male pianists
American people of Irish descent
Avenged Sevenfold members
Drug-related deaths in California
Musicians from Orange County, California
People from Huntington Beach, California
Suburban Legends members
20th-century American pianists
20th-century American drummers
American male drummers
21st-century American drummers
20th-century American male singers
20th-century American singers